Kohnab (also Romanized as Kohnāb) is a village in Hati Rural District, Hati District, Lali County, Khuzestan Province, Iran. At the 2006 census, its population was 127, in 22 families.

References 

Populated places in Lali County